Corey Johnson, better known by his stage name Sunspot Jonz, is a rapper from Oakland, California. He is a founding member of Living Legends, a conglomerate of underground hip hop artists from California. He is also one half of Mystik Journeymen along with Luckyiam.

History
Sunspot Jonz has gone by other surnames before, the most notable and well-known being BFAP, which stands for Brother From Another Planet, and Vision.

Sunspot Jonz released Don't Let 'Em Stop You in 2003. It features contributions from Dirt Nasty, Moka Only and The Grouch.

He released two solo albums, Fight-Destroy-Rock and The Darkside ov Heaven, in 2009.

Discography

Albums
 Child ov the Storm (2000)
 Underground Legend (2000)
 Fallen Angelz (2002)
 Don't Let 'Em Stop You (2003)
 No Guts No Glory (2004)
 Only the Strong Shall Survive (2005)
 Back in Black (2006)
 Never Surrender (2008)
 Fight-Destroy-Rock (2009)
 The Darkside ov Heaven (2009)
 Galaxy of Dreams (G.O.D.) (2012)
 Skywalkers (2013)
 Legend1 (2015)

EPs
 Unleashed (2000)
 Dirty Faces (2001)
 Ghostworld (2003)

Guest appearances
 Awol One & Factor – "Darkness" from Owl Hours (2009)
 Factor Chandelier - "Black Fantasia" from 13 Stories (A Prelude) (2010) 
 Factor Chandelier - "A Part of Me Now" from Club Soda Series I (2011) 
 Myka 9 – "Oh Yeah... Alright" from Mykology (2012)
 Factor Chandelier - "Born Alone, Death Unknown" from Single Series (2016) 
 Factor Chandelier - "Tiger Fight (Sunloa)" from Time Invested II (2022)
 Alex Asher Daniel - "Dakini (God’s Eye Mix)" (2022)

See also
 Living Legends
 Luckyiam

References

External links
 
 
 
 
 Legendary Music

African-American male rappers
Living people
Rappers from Los Angeles
Year of birth missing (living people)
Underground rappers
21st-century American rappers
21st-century American male musicians
21st-century African-American musicians